Maharaja College or Maharaja's College may refer to:
Maharaja College,Arrah
 Maharaja's College, Ernakulam
 Maharaja College, Jaipur
 Maharaja's College, Mysore
 His Highness Maharaja's University College, Thiruvananthapuram
 Maharaja Agrasen College, Delhi